Francis Oswald Bennett (19 February 1898 – 4 August 1976) was a New Zealand medical doctor, military medical administrator and writer. He was born in Christchurch, New Zealand on 19 February 1898.

References

1898 births
1976 deaths
New Zealand general practitioners
New Zealand writers
New Zealand medical administrators